Dean Wells (born July 20, 1970) is a former American football linebacker who played in the National Football League (NFL), from 1993 to 2001.  He played for the Seattle Seahawks, Carolina Panthers, and New England Patriots. Wells played college football at the University of Kentucky.

References

Living people
1970 births
Players of American football from Louisville, Kentucky
American football linebackers
Kentucky Wildcats football players
Seattle Seahawks players
Carolina Panthers players
New England Patriots players